"Chunky" is the debut single from German duo Format B. It was released on 13 November 2015 as a digital download in the United Kingdom through Ministry of Sound Records. The song debuted at number 29 on the UK Singles Chart and at number 5 on the UK Dance Chart. It samples the Shorty Long song "Function at the Junction".

Track listing

Weekly charts

Certifications

References

2015 singles
2015 songs
Ministry of Sound singles
Songs written by Eddie Holland
Songs written by Shorty Long